Samson was a crane barge which ran aground off the coast of Ireland in 1987.

Samson had left Liverpool on 9 December 1987, bound for Valletta, Malta. Though the barge was initially being towed by a tugboat, the towline parted in near gale force conditions while off the Welsh coast early on 11 December. The two men aboard the barge were rescued by an RAF Sea King flying from RAF Brawdy, after attempts to reconnect the tow line failed.

The barge eventually ran aground at Rams Head, Ardmore, County Waterford, at approximately 7.50 am on 12 December. Dangerous pollutants were removed soon after the barge went aground, but despite questions being raised in the Dáil Éireann, the wrecked barge was not salvaged and remains in situ. The ships' propeller was removed and put on display in the village of Ardmore.

In April 2016 the entire jib collapsed into the sea.

Gallery

References
Dáil Éireann - Volume 377 - 2 February 1988 Ceisteanna—Questions. Oral Answers. - Crane Ship Samson
The 'Crane Ship' Samson, Ardmore

Floating cranes
Maritime incidents in 1987
Shipwrecks of Ireland
1959 ships